Caspian Lake may refer to:

 Caspian Lake (Vermont), also referred to as Lake Caspian, located in Greensboro, Vermont
 Caspian Lake (Wisconsin), a 17-acre lake located in Vilas County, Wisconsin

See also
 Caspian Sea

References